In Greek mythology, Stheneboea (Ancient Greek: Σθενέβοια Sthenéboia; the "strong cow" or "strong through cattle") was the daughter of Iobates, king in Lycia. She was the consort of Proetus, joint-king in the Argolid with Acrisius, having his seat at Tiryns. According to early sources, Stheneboea was the daughter of Aphidas and brother of Aleus. Homer and other early writers gave the name of the consort of Proetus as Antea, Antaea, or Anteia.

Mythology 
Stheneboea took a fancy to Bellerophon but was repulsed. As in the Biblical account of Potiphar's wife, she testified falsely against Bellerophon, accusing him of advances and even attempted rape to her husband, who sent him on a deadly mission to Iobates. Bellerophon later returned to Tiryns and punished Stheneboea. Some say that Bellerophon took her for a ride on Pegasus and threw her to the ground but others maintain that this was unworthy of a hero so Bellerophon would not have done such a deed. Others assert that Bellerophon married Stheneboea's sister and consequently it was inevitable that the allegations would be exposed as false so this resulted in Stheneboea's suicide since she feared exposure and public denouncement.

Divine judgement was added to this tragic end, since Stheneboea's three daughters were overcome with madness, inflicted by either Hera or Dionysus, and took to ranging over the mountains as maenads, assaulting travellers.

Parallel stories
Robert Graves observes that Anteia's attempted seduction of Bellerophon has several Greek parallels and draws attention to Biadice's love for Phrixus, which "recalls Potiphar's wife's love for Joseph, a companion myth from Canaan" as well as Cretheis and Peleus, Phaedra and Hippolytus or Philonome and Tenes. Graves also notes the parallel in the Egyptian Tale of the Two Brothers, from about the end of the second millennium BC. "Such poisonous triangular relationships," Jeffrey A White has observed in this context, "with negligible variations of detail and conclusion (the common ingredients being a failed seductress, an innocent youth and a deceived father-figure), can be multiplied easily from Greek myth, as from Hebrew. That the Bellerophon-Proetus-Anteia relationship recalls quite vividly the Joseph-Potiphar-Potiphar's wife episode in Gen. 39, is well known."

Stheneboea, "cattle queen"
Stheneboea is one of a number of female figures named for their role as "cattle queens"; they include Phereboia ("bringing in cattle"), and Polyboia ("worth much cattle"). In archaic Greece cattle were a source of wealth and a demonstration of social pre-eminence; they also signified the numinous presence of Hera.

Notes

References

 Euripides' tragedies Stheneboia and Bellerophon are both lost.
 Hesiod, Catalogue of women
 Pseudo-Apollodorus, Bibliotheke ii.4.1.
 Diodorus Siculus, iv.68.
 Heroic Patterns, Heroes of Greek Mythology 13.

Princesses in Greek mythology
Queens in Greek mythology
Arcadian characters in Greek mythology
Lycians
Arcadian mythology
Lycia
Suicides in Greek mythology